My Amazing Boyfriend (Chinese: 我的奇妙男友; pinyin: Wo De Qi Miao Nan You) is a 2016 Chinese web series starring Janice Wu and Kim Tae-hwan, in a romance story between a 500 year old superhuman and a B-list actress.
The series is an adaptation of a popular Chinese novel by Shui Qianmo. It aired online via Tencent from 24 April to 1 June 2016.

Synopsis 
Xue Ling Qiao (Kim Tae Hwan), an otherworldly being who has been asleep for a century, is accidentally awakened by Tian Jing Zhi (Janice Wu), who is forced to share her home with this awkward man with super powers. From bickering to eventually warming up to each other, unlikely romance blossoms between them, but will a cosmic conspiracy keep them apart?

Cast 
Janice Wu as Tian Jingzhi
Kim Tae-hwan as Xue Lingqiao
Shen Mengchen as Zhang Xuanxuan
Fu Jia as Li Yanzhi
Xu Ke as Ye Chen
Li Xinliang as Hong Shiguang
Yang Yifei as Feng Dongdong
Lily Tien as Tian Jingzhi's mother

Soundtrack

Awards and nominations

References 

2016 Chinese television series debuts
Chinese romantic comedy television series
Television shows based on Chinese novels
2016 Chinese television series endings
Chinese web series
Chinese fantasy television series
Tencent original programming
Television series by Huace Media
2016 web series debuts